Babatunde Lawal is an art historian and scholar of the arts of Nigeria. His research is focused on the visual culture of the Yoruba and its influences in the Americas. He is currently a professor of Art History at Virginia Commonwealth University.

Lawal was born and raised in Isale-Eko (Oju Olokun Street), a district of Lagos. Having been raised in Nigeria himself, Lawal's scholarship demonstrates the use of a theoretical model that draws heavily from first-person accounts of various Nigeria customs and art making practices. This sets him apart from the majority of European and American scholars of African art.

In his book on Gelede, Lawal writes: "A number of scholars [...] have called for a new critical approach that will allow African traditions to be studied on their own terms, instead of being viewed through Eurocentric lenses... What is urgently needed, as Henry Gates has pointed out, is a method that enables a given culture 'to speak for itself about its nature and various functions, rather than to read it, or analyse it, in terms of... theories borrowed whole from other traditions, appropriated from without.'"

References

Living people
20th-century Nigerian historians
People from Lagos
American people of Yoruba descent
Nigerian emigrants to the United States
Virginia Commonwealth University faculty
Historians of African art
Yoruba historians
Yoruba academics
Historians of Yoruba art
Year of birth missing (living people)
Residents of Lagos